Dale G. Larson, Ph.D., is a professor of Counseling Psychology at Santa Clara University, where he directs graduate studies in health psychology. He is best known for his contributions to the end-of-life field and for his research on self-concealment.

Education
Larson received his B.A. in psychology from the University of Chicago in 1971, and earned a PhD in Clinical Psychology from the University of California, Berkeley, in 1977.

Work in psychology and end-of-life field
Larson's scholarly interests have focused on end-of-life care issues, grief and grief counseling, counseling skills, stress and stress management in the helping professions, and self-concealment. The Self-Concealment Scale he co-authored has now been used in more than 150 empirical studies. His award-winning book, The Helper’s Journey: Working with People Facing Grief, Loss, and Life-Threatening Illness, and his publications on grief counseling, have had significant impact on the field. Other contributions include:
 Senior Editor and contributing author, the Robert Wood Johnson funded national newspaper series, Finding Our Way: Living With Dying in America, which reached 7 million Americans
Author, the Caring Helper: Skills for Caregiving in Grief and Loss videotape series
 Chairperson, First National Conference on Hospice Volunteerism, National Hospice Organization, San Diego, CA
 Co-director, Berkeley Hospice Training Project, an NIMH- funded national mental health training program for hospice workers

Selected Articles and Chapters: 
 Larson, D. G., Chastain, R. L., Hoyt, W. T., & Ayzenberg, R. (2015). Self-concealment: Integrative review and working model. Journal of Social and Clinical Psychology, 34(8), 705–729.
 Larson, D. G. (2013).  A person-centred approach to grief counselling. In M. Cooper, M. OHara, P. F. Schmid, & A. Bohart (Eds.), The handbook of person-centred psychotherapy and counselling (2nd ed., pp. 313–326). New York: Palgrave Macmillan.
 Larson, D. G., & Hoyt, W. T. (2007). What has become of grief counseling: An evaluation of the empirical foundations of the new pessimism.  Professional Psychology: Research and Practice, 38, 347–355.
 Larson, D. G., & Bush, N.J. (2006). Stress management for oncology nurses: Finding a healing balance. In R.M. Carroll-Johnson, L.M. Gorman, & N.J. Bush (Eds.), Psychosocial nursing care along the cancer continuum (2nd ed.) (pp. 587–601). Pittsburgh, PA: Oncology Nursing Society. 
 Larson, D. G., & Tobin, D. R. (2000).  End-of-life conversations: Evolving practice and theory. JAMA, 284, 1573–1578.
 Larson, D. G., & Chastain, R. L.  (1990).  Self-concealment:  Conceptualization, measurement, and health implications.  Journal of Social and Clinical Psychology, 9, 439–455.

Awards and memberships
Death Educator Award, Association for Death Education and Counseling, 2016
Fellow, Division 32, Humanistic Psychology, 2016
Fellow, Division 38, Health Psychology, 2009
Fellow, Division 17, Counseling Psychology, 2008
Member, International Work Group on Death, Dying and Bereavement
The Helper's Journey: Working With People Facing Grief, Loss, and Life-Threatening Illness cited as a 1993 Book of the Year by the American Journal of Nursing
 Kara Pioneer Award (“In recognition of pioneering work in end-of-life care”), 2007
 Award of Excellence for Educational Achievement, National Hospice Organization, 1997 
 Summer Scholar,  Stanford Center for Advanced Study in the Behavioral Sciences,  1988

Media and conference presentations
Dale Larson has been a keynote presenter at hundreds of professional conferences in the United States and abroad, and has appeared in many printed media publications, television programs, and radio broadcasts, including NBC News, Radio National's Life Matters Program (AU), Australian Associated Press, Sydney Morning Herald, ABC Radio, Radio New Zealand, CKNX Radio, Washingtonpost.com, Men’s Health, Newsweek, First for Women, and Family Circle. He is a popular conference presenter among colleagues at the Association for Death Education and Counseling.

References

External links
Website 
Self-Concealment Research Collaborative 
Finding Our Way newspaper series 
International Work Group on Death Dying and Bereavement 

21st-century American psychologists
Living people
Santa Clara University faculty
University of Chicago alumni
University of California, Berkeley alumni
Year of birth missing (living people)